Moore Bay is an inlet in the north-east of Prince Patrick Island, Northwest Territories, Canada.

Bays of the Northwest Territories